Forest Hills Historic District may refer to:

 Forest Hills Historic District (Indianapolis, Indiana), listed on the NRHP in Indiana
 Forest Hills Historic District (Durham, North Carolina), listed on the NRHP in North Carolina
 Forest Hills Historic District (Columbia, South Carolina), listed on the NRHP in South Carolina
 Forest Hills Boulevard Historic District, Knoxville, Tennessee, listed on the NRHP in Tennessee